For the second consecutive season the Toronto Argonauts and Winnipeg Blue Bombers met for the Grey Cup. The Argonauts won the game.

Canadian Football News in 1938
The Edmonton Eskimos joined the WIFU and adopted the colours of blue and white. The Eskimos eventually withdrew from the union in 1940.

Regular season

Final regular season standings
Note: GP = Games Played, W = Wins, L = Losses, T = Ties, PF = Points For, PA = Points Against, Pts = Points

*Bold text means that they have clinched the playoffs.

Grey Cup playoffs
Note: All dates in 1938

Semifinals

Sarnia won the total-point series by 24–5. Sarnia will play the Toronto Argonauts (IRFU Champions) in the Eastern Finals.

Toronto won the total-point series by 14–4. Toronto will play the Sarnia Imperials (ORFU Champions) in the Eastern Finals.

Finals

Winnipeg won the total-point series by 25–9. Winnipeg advances to the Grey Cup game.

Toronto advances to the Grey Cup game.

Playoff bracket

Grey Cup Championship

Note: Eastern Final Playoff date is not confirmed, however since the regular season in the East ended November 12, and all other playoff dates, as well as Grey Cup date are accurate, it is reasonable to assume the above date is accurate.1938 Eastern (Combined IRFU & ORFU) All-Stars NOTE: During this time most players played both ways, so the All-Star selections do not distinguish between some offensive and defensive positions.1st Team
QB – Annis Stukus, Toronto Argonauts
FW – Ted Morris, Toronto Argonauts
HB – Johnny Ferraro, Montreal Nationals
HB – Hugh Sterling, Sarnia Imperials
HB – Art West, Toronto Argonauts
E  – Wes Cutler, Toronto Argonauts
E  – Bernie Thompson, Toronto Argonauts
C  – George Willis, University of Western Ontario
G – Charles "Tiny" Hermann, Ottawa Rough Riders
G – Bob Reid, Toronto Balmy Beach Beachers
T – Dave Sprague, Ottawa Rough Riders
T – Mike Clawson, Sarnia Imperials

2nd Team
QB – Ab Box, Toronto Balmy Beach Beachers
FW – Ernie Hempey, Montreal Nationals
HB – Murray Griffin, Ottawa Rough Riders
HB – Herb Westman, McGill University
HB – Bob Isbister, Toronto Argonauts
E  – Tony McCarthy, Ottawa Rough Riders
E  – Syd Reynolds, Toronto Balmy Beach Beachers
C  – Joseph "Curley" Moynahan, Ottawa Rough Riders
G – Alex Fleming, Montreal Nationals
G – George Fraser, Ottawa Rough Riders
T – Tommy Burns, Montreal Indians
T – Bunny Wadsworth, Ottawa Rough Riders

1938 Ontario Rugby Football Union All-StarsNOTE: During this time most players played both ways, so the All-Star selections do not distinguish between some offensive and defensive positions.''

QB – Ab Box, Toronto Balmy Beach Beachers
FW – Ernie Hempey, Montreal Nationals
HB – Johnny Ferraro, Montreal Nationals
HB – Eddie Thompson, Toronto Balmy Beach Beachers
DB – Hugh Sterling, Sarnia Imperials
E  – Syd Reynolds, Toronto Balmy Beach Beachers
E  – Eddie Burton, Montreal Nationals
C  – Dave Ryan, Montreal Nationals
G – Bob Reid, Toronto Balmy Beach Beachers
G – Alex Fleming, Montreal Nationals
T – Mike Clawson, Sarnia Imperials
T – Tommy Burns, Montreal Nationals

1938 Canadian Football Awards
 Jeff Russel Memorial Trophy (IRFU MVP) – Wes Cutler (DE), Toronto Argonauts
 Imperial Oil Trophy (ORFU MVP) - John Ferraro - Montreal Nationals

References

 
Canadian Football League seasons
Grey Cups hosted in Toronto